Nadine de Klerk (born 16 January 2000) is a South African cricketer. She made her Women's One Day International cricket (WODI) debut against India in the 2017 South Africa Quadrangular Series on 9 May 2017. She made her Women's Twenty20 International cricket (WT20I) debut for South Africa against India on 13 February 2018.

In February 2019, Cricket South Africa named her as one of the players in the Powerade Women's National Academy intake for 2019. In September 2019, she was named in the F van der Merwe XI squad for the inaugural edition of the Women's T20 Super League in South Africa. In January 2020, she was named in South Africa's squad for the 2020 ICC Women's T20 World Cup in Australia.

In March 2020, she was awarded with a national contract by Cricket South Africa ahead of the 2020–21 season. On 23 July 2020, de Klerk was named in South Africa's 24-woman squad to begin training in Pretoria, ahead of their tour to England.

In February 2022, she was named as one of three reserves in South Africa's team for the 2022 Women's Cricket World Cup in New Zealand. In June 2022, de Klerk was named in South Africa's Women's Test squad for their one-off match against England Women. She made her Test debut on 27 June 2022, for South Africa against England.

In July 2022, she was named in South Africa's team for the cricket tournament at the 2022 Commonwealth Games in Birmingham, England.

References

External links
 
 

2000 births
Living people
Cricketers from Pretoria
South African women cricketers
South Africa women Test cricketers
South Africa women One Day International cricketers
South Africa women Twenty20 International cricketers
Northerns women cricketers
Western Province women cricketers
Brisbane Heat (WBBL) cricketers
Cricketers at the 2022 Commonwealth Games
Commonwealth Games competitors for South Africa
21st-century South African women